Ospedale Giuseppe Capilupi Capri is a hospital (Italian: Ospedale) on the Via Provinciale in Anacapri, Capri, located just to the west of the comune center and about half a kilometre north of the Marina Piccola. It's the hospital of the island.

References

Buildings and structures in Capri, Campania
Hospitals in Italy